George Reid Thomson, Lord Thomson,  (1893 – 15 April 1962) was a Scottish Labour Party politician and judge.

Educated at the South African College, Cape Town, and Corpus Christi College, Oxford, he was a captain in the Argyll and Sutherland Highlanders in World War I.

He was admitted as an advocate in 1922, and appointed a King's Counsel in 1936. He was an Advocate Depute from 1940 to 1945. 
He sat as member of parliament (MP) for Edinburgh East from October 1945 until October 1947 and served as Lord Advocate from October 1945.
He was appointed a Privy Counsellor in 1945.

In October 1947 he was raised to the bench as Lord Justice Clerk, replacing Lord Moncrieff. He took the judicial title Lord Thomson. He held this office until his death in 1962.

References

External links 
 

1893 births
1962 deaths
Alumni of Corpus Christi College, Oxford
Argyll and Sutherland Highlanders officers
British Army personnel of World War I
Lord Advocates
Lords Justice Clerk
Members of the Parliament of the United Kingdom for Edinburgh constituencies
Members of the Privy Council of the United Kingdom
Ministers in the Attlee governments, 1945–1951
Scottish Labour MPs
Thomson
UK MPs 1945–1950